

Codes

References

B